Sabah al-Salem Stadium is a multi-purpose stadium in Kuwait City, Kuwait. It is currently used mostly for football matches and is the home stadium of Al Arabi Kuwait. The stadium holds 15,000 people and hosted many matches of the 1980 AFC Asian Cup, including the final.

This is the home stadium of Al Arabi.

References

Football venues in Kuwait
AFC Asian Cup stadiums
Multi-purpose stadiums in Kuwait
Sports venues completed in 1979
1979 establishments in Kuwait